

Active ships 
 s
 HMS Ledbury (M30)
 HMS Cattistock (M31)
 HMS Brocklesby (M33)
 HMS Middleton (M34)
 HMS Chiddingfold (M37)
 HMS Hurworth (M39)
 s
 HMS Penzance (M106)
 HMS Pembroke (M107)
 HMS Grimsby (M108)
 HMS Bangor (M109)
 HMS Shoreham (M112)

Historical ships
Naval mine clearance was originally done by whatever type of vessel could easily be adapted to the task, paddle steamers proving particularly suited due to their shallow draught. In both World Wars naval trawlers were used, as they were naturally suitable for wire sweeping. In World War II this task was given to smaller trawlers of about 300 tons, larger ones being used for anti-submarine work. The increased sophistication and threat posed by the mine meant that specialist mine countermeasure vessels eventually had to be built: the Minesweeping Sloop. This term was officially dropped in 1937, but remained in use nonetheless. The Royal Navy has possessed such vessels since 1914.

There were also some conversions of ships originally built for other purposes for special minesweeping. This was mainly early in World War II for sweeping acoustic and magnetic mines, and later in the war for sweeping influence mines. The ships selected were of varying origin and age and thus do not form a class as such.

  sloop (112 ships in 4 sub-classes, launched 1914–1918) convoy sloops intended originally for minesweeping
 Hunt class, Belvoir group (20 ships, launched 1916–17) Ailsa twin-screw coastal minesweeping sloops
 Hunt class, Aberdare group (87 ships, launched 1917–1919) Admiralty twin-screw coastal minesweeping sloops
  (14 ships, launched 1917–1919) tunnel-screw coastal minesweeping sloops
  (32 ships in 2 sub-classes, launched 1916–1918) paddlewheel coastal minesweeping sloops
  (7 reciprocating and 14 turbine ships, launched 1933–1939) twin-screw minesweeping sloops
  (14 ships, launched 1940–1942) diesel twin-screw single-role minesweeping sloops
 Blyth class (Bangor class II) (19 ships, launched 1940–1943) reciprocating Bangor variant
 Ardrossan class (Bangor class III) (26 ships, launched 1940–1942) turbine Bangor variant
  (47 ships, launched 1940–1943 only served with the Royal Australian Navy and Royal Indian Navy) Australian Bangor variant
  (403 ships, launched 1940–1945) inshore acoustic / magnetic motor minesweepers
  (98 ships, launched 1941–1945) twin-screw multi-role minesweeping sloops
  (22 ships, twin-screw multi-role minesweeping sloops, transferred from the US Navy in 1941 under the Lend-Lease program)
  (150 ships, launched 1941–1943) British-built acoustic / magnetic motor minesweepers
  (2 ships, launched 1943) towed pressure-mine detonating vessels
  (116 ships, launched 1952–1959) open-water minesweepers, minehunters and mine countermeasures vessels
  (93 ships, launched 1954–1959) inshore minesweepers
  (10 ships, launched 1952–1955) inshore minehunters
 Wilton-class minesweeper/minehunter (1 ship, launched 18 January 1972) open-water minesweeper and minehunter. Prototype ship built of glass reinforced plastic (GRP) to same hull design as Ton class. Forerunner of the Hunt and Sandown classes, also built of GRP. 
  (13 ships, launched 1978–1988) mine countermeasures vessels
  (2 ships, bought 1979) deep-water single-role minesweepers
  (12 ships, launched 1982–1985) deep-water single-role minesweepers
  (12 ships, launched 1990–2001) single-role minehunters

See also
 Trawlers of the Royal Navy
 Auxiliary Patrol
 Royal Naval Patrol Service

Mines countermeasure vessels
Royal Navy